Digerudgrunnen Lighthouse was a coastal lighthouse in the inner Oslofjord, in the municipality of Frogn in Viken, Norway. It was established in 1871, and closed in 1975. The lighthouse is demolished.

References

Lighthouses completed in 1871
Lighthouses in Viken
1871 establishments in Norway
1975 disestablishments in Norway